The 1994–95 NHL season was the 78th regular season of the National Hockey League. The teams played a shortened season, due to a lockout of the players by the owners. In addition, the NHL All-Star Game, which had been scheduled to take place January 20–21, 1995, in San Jose, California, was canceled. San Jose was soon selected as the venue for the 1997 NHL All-Star Game. The New Jersey Devils swept the heavily favored Detroit Red Wings for their first Stanley Cup win. It was also their first appearance in the finals overall.

League business
The Hartford Whalers were purchased by Peter Karmanos.

This was the last season in Quebec City for the Quebec Nordiques, as they announced that they would move to Denver after the season and become the Colorado Avalanche.

It was the first season with games televised by Fox, which they would do until the end of the 1998–99 season. It marked the first major American broadcast agreement for the NHL since 1975. Fox split Stanley Cup Finals games with ESPN.

The regular season was shortened because of a 103-day lockout, which ended on January 11, 1995. The season got underway nine days later.

New arenas
The Boston Bruins played their final season at the Boston Garden. They would then move to their current arena, the TD Garden (then named the FleetCenter).

The Vancouver Canucks played their last season at Pacific Coliseum. They would play at GM Place (now known as Rogers Arena) the following year.

The Chicago Blackhawks moved to the United Center.

The St. Louis Blues moved to the Kiel Center (now the Enterprise Center).

Events
March 10, 1995 – the game between the San Jose Sharks and Detroit Red Wings was postponed due to the Guadalupe River flooding, making it impossible for the teams to travel to the San Jose Arena.

Rule changes
 Two Zambonis would now be required by every arena for the resurfacing between periods.
 A coach can call for a stick measurement in any overtime period or shootout, but the request must be made before the winning goal is scored.
 Leaving the penalty box to join an altercation on the ice risks automatic three-game ban, plus any other penalties assessed.
 Any severe check from behind risks a major penalty and game misconduct.
 Referees and linesmen would wear numbers instead of nameplates; this restored a practice that had been in use previously from 1955 to 1977.

Regular season
Due to the 1994–95 NHL lockout, the league shortened the season length from 84 games, the length of the previous two seasons, to 48. Furthermore, the season would last from January 20 to May 3; this was the first time in NHL history that the regular season extended into May. The next time was the 2020–21 NHL season. Regular-season games would be limited to intra-conference play (Eastern Conference teams did not play Western Conference teams).

This was the first season since 1969–70, that the Montreal Canadiens missed the playoffs.

Final standings

Note: No. = Division rank, CR = Conference rank, W = Wins, L = Losses, T = Ties, GF = Goals For, GA = Goals Against, Pts = Points

         Teams that qualified for the playoffs are highlighted in bold.

Playoffs

Bracket

Awards
The NHL Awards presentation took place on July 6, 1995.

All-Star teams

Player statistics

Scoring leaders

Note: GP = Games Played, G = Goals, A = Assists, Pts = Points

Leading goaltenders
Regular season

Milestones

Debuts

The following is a list of players of note who played their first NHL game in 1994–95, listed with their first team (asterisk(*) marks debut in playoffs):
Paul Kariya, Mighty Ducks of Anaheim
Cory Stillman, Calgary Flames
Eric Daze, Chicago Blackhawks
Jamie Langenbrunner, Dallas Stars
Manny Fernandez, Dallas Stars
Ryan Smyth, Edmonton Oilers
Marek Malik, Hartford Whalers
Craig Conroy, Montreal Canadiens
Brian Rolston, New Jersey Devils
Tommy Salo, New York Islanders
Adam Deadmarsh, Quebec Nordiques
Peter Forsberg, Quebec Nordiques
Adrian Aucoin, Vancouver Canucks
Jim Carey, Washington Capitals
Sergei Gonchar, Washington Capitals
Nikolai Khabibulin, Winnipeg Jets

Last games

The following is a list of players of note who played their last game in the NHL in 1994–95 (listed with their last team):
Mats Naslund, Boston Bruins
Craig Simpson, Buffalo Sabres
Jim Peplinski, Calgary Flames
Dirk Graham, Chicago Blackhawks
Mark Howe, Detroit Red Wings
Mike Krushelnyski, Detroit Red Wings
Kent Nilsson, Edmonton Oilers (Last active player to have been a member of the Atlanta Flames)
Gaetan Duchesne, Florida Panthers
Steve Larmer, New York Rangers
Peter Stastny, St. Louis Blues
Gerard Gallant, Tampa Bay Lightning
Dave Poulin, Washington Capitals
Thomas Steen, Winnipeg Jets

Trading deadline
Trading deadline: April 7, 1995.
April 7, 1995: D Petr Svoboda traded from Buffalo to Philadelphia for D Garry Galley.
April 7, 1995: C Troy Murray and D Norm Maciver traded from Ottawa to Pittsburgh for RW Martin Straka.
April 7, 1995: D Gord Kruppke traded from Toronto to Detroit for other considerations.
April 7, 1995: RW Russ Courtnall traded from Dallas to Vancouver for LW Greg Adams and RW Dan Kesa and Vancouver's fifth round pick in 1995 Entry Draft.
April 7, 1995: G Corey Hirsch traded from New York Rangers to Vancouver for C Nathan LaFayette.
April 7, 1995: D Gerald Diduck traded from Vancouver to Chicago for RW Bogdan Savenko and Hartford's third round pick in 1995 Entry Draft (previously acquired).
April 7, 1995: G Rick Tabaracci traded from Washington to Calgary for a conditional fifth round draft pick.
April 7, 1995: LW Gaetan Duchesne traded from San Jose to Florida for Florida's sixth round pick in 1995 Entry Draft.
April 7, 1995: G Craig Billington traded from Ottawa to Boston for other considerations.
April 7, 1995: LW Bill Huard traded from Ottawa to Quebec for D Mika Stromberg and Quebec's fourth round pick in 1995 Entry Draft.
April 7, 1995: D Daniel Laperriere and St. Louis' ninth round pick in 1995 Entry Draft traded from St. Louis to Ottawa for Ottawa's ninth round pick in 1995 Entry Draft.
April 7, 1995: RW Roman Oksiuta traded from Edmonton to Vancouver for D Jiri Slegr.
April 7, 1995: LW Alan May traded from Dallas to Calgary for Calgary's eighth round pick in 1995 Entry Draft.
April 7, 1995: C Mike Eastwood and Toronto's third round pick in 1995 Entry Draft traded from Toronto to Winnipeg for RW Tie Domi.
April 7, 1995: D Grant Jennings traded from Pittsburgh to Toronto for D Drake Berehowsky.
April 7, 1995: D Igor Ulanov and C Mike Eagles traded from Winnipeg to Washington for Washington's third and fifth round draft picks in 1995 Entry Draft.
April 7, 1995: Edmonton Oilers trade Scott Pearson to the Buffalo Sabres for Ken Sutton.
April 7, 1995: Pittsburgh Penguins trade Greg Brown to the Winnipeg Jets for a conditional eighth round draft pick in 1996 Entry Draft.
April 7, 1995: New York Rangers trade Ed Olczyk to the Winnipeg Jets for Winnipeg's fifth round pick in 1995 Entry Draft.
April 5, 1995: Montreal Canadiens obtain Pierre Turgeon and Vladimir Malakhov from the New York Islanders for Kirk Muller, Mathieu Schneider and Craig Darby.

Coaches

Eastern Conference

Western Conference

See also
 List of Stanley Cup champions
 1994 NHL Entry Draft
 1994–95 NHL lockout
 NHL All-Rookie Team
 1994 in sports
 1995 in sports

References
 
 
 
 
Notes

External links
Hockey Database

 
1994–95 in American ice hockey by league
1994–95 in Canadian ice hockey by league
1994 in American sports